Vladislav Nailyevich Shayakhmetov (born 25 August 1981) is a Russian football and futsal player. He is a member of the Russian national futsal team.

Honours

Individual
 World's Best Futsal Player 2007

With MFK Viz-Sinara
 Winner of the UEFA Cup Futsal Cup 2007-08
 Winner of the Cup of Russia on mini-football 2007

With MFK Dinamo Yamal 
 Winner of the Cup of Russia on mini-football 2009

With Russia national futsal team 
 Silver winner of the UEFA European Futsal Cup 2005
 Bronze winner of the UEFA European Futsal Cup 2007
 Semifinalist World Cup Futsal Cup 2008

External links
 MFK Dinamo Yamal profile

1981 births
Living people
Russian footballers
FC Ural Yekaterinburg players
Russian men's futsal players
Tatar people of Russia
Tatar sportspeople
People from Revda, Sverdlovsk Oblast
Association football forwards
FC Uralets Nizhny Tagil players
Sportspeople from Sverdlovsk Oblast